François Lionet is a French programmer, best known for having written STOS BASIC on the Atari ST and AMOS BASIC on the Amiga (along with Constantin Sotiropoulos). He has also written several games on these platforms.

In 1994, he founded Clickteam with Yves Lamoureux, producing the Klik series of games-creation tools, including Multimedia Fusion.

Software
  2019 AMOS2
  2013 Clickteam Fusion 2.5
  2006 The Games Factory 2.0
  2006 Multimedia Fusion 2.0
  2002 Multimedia Fusion 1.5
  1999 
  1997-98 Multimedia Fusion 1.0
  1996-97 The Games Factory 1.0
  1995-96 Corel Click & Create
  1993-94 Klik & Play
  1993 AMOSPro Compiler
  1992 AMOS Professional
  1992 Easy AMOS
  1991 AMOS Compiler
  1990 AMOS BASIC
  1989 STOS Compiler
  1988 STOS BASIC
  1987 Captain Blood (PC and C64)
  1983-86 Various 8-bit games

References

Amiga people
French computer programmers
Living people
Year of birth missing (living people)
Video game programmers